Mahlon N. Kline (6 February 1846 – 27 November 1909) was an American pharmacist who was president and general manager of Smith Kline & Co.

Career
Born in Windsor Township in Pennsylvania, Mahlon Kline was educated at a local school in Upper Bern. He qualified as a teacher and briefly taught at a school at Hyde Park.  He then went to the Eastman Business College at Poughkeepsie.

In 1865 he joined Smith & Shoemaker: Mr Shoemaker resigned in 1869 and in 1875 the business became Smith Kline & Co. Under Mahlon Kline's leadership it became the third largest pharmaceutical business in the United States.

He was active in local business affairs and, in 1900, became a director of the local Bourse. He was also active in State politics and in 1905 he became treasurer of the State Committee of the Lincoln Party.

He died in 1909.

Family
In 1874 he married Isadora E. Unger and together they went on to have two daughters, Isadora Caroline Kline and Leah Elizabeth Kline, and one son, Clarence Mahlon Kline.

References

1846 births
1909 deaths
19th-century American businesspeople
Businesspeople from Pennsylvania
Businesspeople in the pharmaceutical industry